Clarence Chew Zhe Yu (born 27 December 1995) is a Singaporean table tennis player. He competed in the 2020 Summer Olympics.

At the 2020 Olympics, Chew competed in the men's singles table tennis event. He won Ibrahima Diaw of Senegal in the first round before losing to the 32nd seed, Daniel Habesohn, of Austria in the second round.

Career
Clarence Chew began his career in 2009 as a national youth player. He made his Southeast Asian Games debut at the 2013 SEA Games. He has represented Singapore at the Youth Olympic Games, Southeast Asian Games, Asian Table Tennis Championships, World Table Tennis Championships, and the Summer Olympic Games

2014 Commonwealth Games 
Clarence won his first Commonwealth Games Gold medal at the 2014 Commonwealth Games in Glasgow in the Men's Team event. He played alongside Gao Ning, Li Hu, Yang Zi and Zhan Jian.

2020 Summer Olympics 
Clarence became the first Singapore-born table tennis player to represent the country at the Summer Olympic Games in Tokyo, after winning Koen Pang, in the finals at the Asian Olympic Qualification Tournament in Qatar in March.

Clarence defeated world ranked 71 Ibrahima Diaw of Senegal in the first round with a score of 4-2. He proceeded to the second round where he lost to Austria's Daniel Habesohn.

Singles Event

2021 Southeast Asian Games 
Chew, together with teammate Ethan Poh, represented Singapore at the SEA Games in Hanoi, in the Doubles event. In the final, they beat Richard Pugoy Gonzales and John Russel Misal of the Philippines with a score of 3-1. Chew also teamed up with Zeng Jian in the mixed doubles event, clinching a silver after losing in the finals 2-3 to teammates Koen Pang and Wong Xin Ru. Later, in the Men's Singles event, Chew lost 1-4 in the semi-finals to Vietnam's Nguyen Duc Tuan, hence ending the nation's 15 year streak's gold medal haul from 2007 to 2022.

References

External links
 

1995 births
Living people
Singaporean sportspeople of Chinese descent
Table tennis players at the 2020 Summer Olympics
Singaporean male table tennis players
Olympic table tennis players of Singapore
Table tennis players at the 2010 Summer Youth Olympics
Table tennis players at the 2014 Commonwealth Games
Table tennis players at the 2022 Commonwealth Games
Southeast Asian Games gold medalists for Singapore
Southeast Asian Games silver medalists for Singapore
Southeast Asian Games bronze medalists for Singapore
Southeast Asian Games medalists in table tennis
Table tennis players at the 2014 Asian Games
Commonwealth Games gold medallists for Singapore
Commonwealth Games silver medallists for Singapore
Commonwealth Games medallists in table tennis
Competitors at the 2021 Southeast Asian Games
Medallists at the 2014 Commonwealth Games
Medallists at the 2022 Commonwealth Games